Kokri Buttran is a village in the Moga district of the Punjab, India. It's also known as Buttran Di Kokri.

Geography

Talwandi Mallian (2.5 km), Kokri Kalaan (3.6 km) and Daya Kalaan (3.8 km) are the nearby villages.

Demographics

In 2001 the village had the total population of 1,758 with 307 households, 937 males and 821 females, thus 53% of males and 47% of females.

Culture
Punjabi is the mother tongue as well as the official language here.

Economy
Agriculture is the main source of income. The main crops are Wheat, Cotton and Rice

References

Villages in Moga district